A quibble may refer to:

a trivial objection
a pun, or play on words
 Quibble (plot device), in narratology
 Quibble (computing), a quad nibble
 A monster from the game My Singing Monsters